"Feel It" is a song by Italian musical group the Tamperer featuring Maya, released as the first single from their only album, Fabulous (1999). Produced by Falox, a production team that then consisted of Tamperer members Mario Fargetta and Alex Farolfi, the song is based on the Jacksons' 1981 hit "Can You Feel It" and quotes Heather Leigh West's lyrics from Urban Discharge's 1996 song "Wanna Drop a House."

The song was a commercial success, reaching number one in the United Kingdom, Ireland, and the Wallonia region of Belgium. It also topped the Canadian RPM Dance/Urban chart, peaked at number two in Italy, and reached the top 10 in eight other countries, including France, Hungary, New Zealand, and Norway.

Background and release
Producer Alex Farolfi went to Ibiza in the summer of 1997 and noticed that the crowd would go wild when a club DJ played "Can You Feel It". Mario Fargetta and Farolfi went together and made a version using a sample of the original by The Jacksons and tested it in Italian clubs. The track was so successful that the producers decided to re-record it properly. "Feel It" was released in May 1998 as the lead single from the group's debut album, Fabulous. Club remixes from British DJ-producer Sharp and Dirty Rotten Scoundrels caught the attention of DJ Pete Tong, who featured a different remix each Friday night for six weeks on his Essential Selection dance music show on CHR network BBC Radio 1 in the United Kingdom.

Critical reception
A reviewer from Daily Record said the song is "brilliant". Pan-European magazine Music & Media commented, "This Italian production team consists of three producers from national CHR network Radio Deejay. DJ Fargetta, Alex Farolfi and Mentiroso use the talents of dance diva Maya as the icing on the cake, which has the Jacksons' Can You Feel It as its main ingredient. Having enjoyed success in Italy, the incredibly catchy track is now being released across Europe."

Chart performance
"Feel It" was successful globally and remains the group's biggest hit to date. In Europe, it peaked at number one in Ireland, Scotland, the United Kingdom, and the Wallonia region of Belgium. In the UK, it peaked during its sixth week on the UK Singles Chart, on 24 May 1998. It also topped the UK Indie Chart, which tracks singles from independent record labels. The single made it to the top 10 also in Denmark, Finland, Flanders, France, Greece, Hungary (number two), Italy (number two), the Netherlands, and Norway, as well as on the Eurochart Hot 100, where it rose to number two. It was a top-20 hit in Austria, Iceland, and Sweden and a top-40 hit in Germany and Switzerland. Outside Europe, "Feel It" went to number one on the RPM Dance/Urban chart in Canada, number four on the Billboard Dance Club Songs chart in the United States, number ten in New Zealand, and number 19 in Australia. The single earned a gold record in Australia, France, and New Zealand while earning a platinum record in Belgium and the UK.

Music video
A music video was made for "Feel It", directed by director Daniel P. Siegler & Tracks.

Track listings

 Italian 12-inch single
A1. "Feel It" (original version) – 5:01
B1. "Feel It" (radio version) – 3:02
B2. "Feel It" (mail version) – 3:50

 US 12-inch single
A1. "Feel It" (Sharp Masterblaster Remix) – 8:21
A2. "Feel It" (radio version) – 3:15
AA1. "Feel It" (Dirty Rotten Scoundrels Voyeurism Vocal Remix) – 6:06
AA2. "Feel It" (Sharp Masterblaster intsrumental) – 8:18

 US promo maxi-single
 "Feel It" (radio edit) – 3:15
 "Feel It" (Sharp Masterblaster Remix) – 8:21
 "Feel It" (Dirty Rotten Scoundrels Voyeurism Vocal Remix) – 6:06
 "Feel in the House" – 5:32
 "Feel It" (Dirty Rotten Scoundrels Clinical Dub) – 6:05

 UK 12-inch single
A1. "Feel It" (original version) – 5:05
A2. "Feel in the House" – 5:30
B1. "Feel It" (Sharp Master Blaster Remix) – 8:21
B2. "Feel It" (Dirty Rotten Scoundrels Voyeurism Vocal Remix) – 6:05

 UK and European CD single
 "Feel It" (Blunt Edit) – 3:15
 "Feel It" (original mix) – 8:21
 "Feel It" (Sharp Master Blaster Remix) – 6:05
 "Feel in the House" – 5:30

 European maxi-single
 "Feel It" (radio edit) – 2:27
 "Feel It" (original version) – 5:05
 "Feel in the House" (extended mix) – 5:30

Credits and personnel
Credits are adapted from the US and European maxi-single liner notes.

Studios
 Recorded at E-Mail Studio (Italy)
 Mastered at Frankfort/Wayne Mastering Labs Inc. (New York City)

Personnel

 Michael Jackson – writing
 Jackie Jackson – writing
 Steve Gittelman – writing
 Jim Dyke – writing

 Maya – vocals
 Falox – production
 Rick Essig – mastering

Charts and certifications

Weekly charts

Year-end charts

Certifications

Release history

References

1998 debut singles
1998 songs
Battery Records (dance) singles
Irish Singles Chart number-one singles
Number-one singles in Scotland
Songs written by Jackie Jackson
Songs written by Jim Dyke
Songs written by Michael Jackson
The Tamperer songs
UK Independent Singles Chart number-one singles
UK Singles Chart number-one singles